Long Melford railway station is a disused station that served the village of Long Melford in Suffolk, England. It opened in 1865 as "Melford" and was renamed "Long Melford" in 1884. Services over the latter route ended in 1961 and the station and Stour Valley line closed in 1967 as part of the Beeching cuts. The station building is now a private residence.

A proposal to extend services by building a light railway between Long Melford and Hadleigh was reported in the Haverhill Echo on 10 March 1900, but was never built.

References

External links
 Long Melford station on navigable 1946 O. S. map
 Long Melford station on Subterranea Britannica website

Disused railway stations in Suffolk
Former Great Eastern Railway stations
Railway stations in Great Britain opened in 1865
Railway stations in Great Britain closed in 1967
Beeching closures in England
1865 establishments in England
1967 disestablishments in England
Long Melford